The 2017 Italian F4 Championship Powered by Abarth was the fourth season of the Italian F4 Championship. It began on 2 April at Misano and finished on 22 October at Autodromo Nazionale di Monza after seven triple header rounds.

The championship title was clinched by and Prema Powerteam driver and Ferrari Driver Academy protegé Marcus Armstrong. Job van Uitert, Lorenzo Colombo, Sebastián Fernández and Artem Petrov were the other drivers who won more than one race, all of them completed the top-five in the driver standings. Leonardo Lorandi won the rookies' championship. Sophia Flörsch was the only woman to compete in the series, but because she did not compete in at least five events, the Woman trophy wasn't given.

Teams and drivers
On 11 March 2017 was announced that 14 teams and more than 30 drivers were scheduled to compete in the 2017 season.

Race calendar
The calendar was published on 29 October 2016. All rounds were held in Italy.

Championship standings

Points were awarded to the top 10 classified finishers in each race. No points were awarded for pole position or fastest lap. Only the best sixteen results were counted towards the championship.  To be able to compete in the main classification, drivers were obliged to compete in at least five rounds, one of these rounds should be the finale in Monza.

Drivers' standings

Secondary championship's standings

Teams' championship

References

External links

Italian F4 Championship seasons
Italian
F4 Championship
Italian F4